Shenker is a surname. Notable people with the surname include:

Israel Shenker, scholar and reporter for The New York Times
Morris Shenker, American lawyer
Scott Shenker, American computer scientist
Stephen Shenker, American theoretical physicist

See also
Judge Shenker, fictional character